Sanctified is the fourth album for Swedish heavy metal band Morgana Lefay.

The album received a review of 9/10 from Rockhard.de. In the Swedish mainstream press, the album got short reviews in Dagens Nyheter, Svenska Dagbladet, Aftonbladet and Helsingborgs Dagblad. Each critic though the album lacked innovation, but Aftonbladet noted that "If every song were as good as "To Isengard", I could not shut off the record". Expressen compared Morgana Lefay to "a bleak Pantera".

Track listing
All music & lyrics written and arranged by: Morgana Lefay

Out In The Silence - 4:05
Time Is God - 5:09
To Isengard - 5:17
Why? - 5:03
Mad Messiah - 5:04
Another Dawn - 4:43
In The Court Of The Crimson King - 3:51
Sorrow Calls - 8:21
Where Insanity Rules - 4:15
Shadows Of God - 4:13
Gil-Galad (The Sanctified) - 7:34

(4:06 minutes into "Gil-Galad (The Sanctified)" there's a "hidden" bonus track)

Credits
 Charles Rytkönen - vocals
 Tony Eriksson - guitars
 Daniel Persson - guitars
 Joakim Heder - bass
 Jonas Söderlind - Drums

References

1995 albums
Morgana Lefay albums
Albums with cover art by Kristian Wåhlin